Johann Strauss II (1825–1899) or Johann Strauss Jr. was an Austrian composer, known as the "Waltz King".

Johann Strauss may also refer to:
Johann Strauss I (1804–1849), or Johann Strauss Sr., Austrian composer, father of Johann Strauss II
Johann Strauss III (1866–1939), Austrian composer, son of Eduard Strauss and grandson of Johann I
Johan Strauss (rugby union) (born 1951), South African rugby union player

See also 
John Strauss (1920–2011), American composer and music editor